Algoryx Simulation AB was formed in 2007 in Umeå, Sweden as a spin-off company from Umeå University. Algoryx currently has three products: Algodoo (formerly Phun), Dynamics for SpaceClaim, and AGX Multiphysics, a professional physics engine for engineering and real-time simulations.

Awards
In February 2011, Algoryx was selected for the list of Top-20 companies to represent Swedish Innovation, by the Swedish Institute, a Swedish government agency.  In March 2011, Algoryx was ranked as one of Sweden's most promising young high tech companies by business magazine Affärsvärlden and tech news paper Ny Teknik. Algoryx again won this award in March 2012. In May 2011, Algoryx was selected by Red Herring for the Top 100 list of the most innovative companies in Europe. In 2012, Algoryx was named to represent Sweden in the European Business Awards. Later that year, Algoryx was also listed on the Deloitte Sweden Fast Technology 50 list. In the spring of 2015, an office was also opened in Munich, Germany, after the company entered into an agreement with German Rheinmetall on simulators for cranes and vehicles. In the autumn of 2017, Algoryx began a collaboration with the Japanese research institute National Institute of Advanced Science and Technology to develop simulation technology for robots to be used in the cleanup work around the Fukushima nuclear power plant, which was destroyed in a 2011 earthquake.

References

External links
Algoryx homepage
Algodoo website

Swedish companies established in 2007
Computer physics engines
Software companies of Sweden
Companies based in Västerbotten County
Umeå University